Bandes may refer to:

 BANDES, The Venezuelan Economic and Social Development Bank 
 Susan Bandes, American lawyer
 Efim Samuilovich Bandes (1866–1927), Russian-Jewish political activist, known in the United States as Louis Miller